The 2018 Connecticut Attorney General election took place on November 6, 2018, to elect the attorney general of Connecticut.

Incumbent Connecticut Attorney General George Jepsen did not seek re-election. Democratic nominee and state representative William Tong defeated Republican nominee Susan Hatfield.

Democratic primary 
On August 14, 2018, State representative William Tong won the Democratic primary, defeating US attorney Chris Mattei and state senator Paul Doyle.

Results

Republican primary 
On August 14, 2018, assistant state's attorney Susan Hatfield won the Republican primary, defeating former state representative John Shaban.

Results

General election 
William Tong won the general election on November 6, 2018 with a 6.01% margin of victory.

Endorsements

Results

References 

Connecticut
Attorney General
Connecticut Attorney General elections